Tas Qureshi, MBBS FRCS (Eng) FRCS (Gen Surg), is a consultant general surgeon and national and international trainer in laparoscopic surgery.  He specialises in keyhole surgery for bowel cancer, inflammatory bowel disease, hernias and gall stones, amongst other conditions.

Qureshi underwent undergraduate training at King’s College Hospital in London. His ‘House Jobs’ were of Professorial Units, a House Physician to Professors McGregor and Swift at King’s College Hospital and House Surgeon to Professors Bailey and Marks at the Royal Surrey County Hospital.  He spent a year at the busy accident and emergency department of King’s College Hospital, London.  Following his basic surgical training in West Sussex, he was appointed to Higher Surgical Training in the Wessex region, finishing his surgical apprenticeship with a laparoscopic fellowship in Portsmouth with Professor Parvaiz.

Qureshi was appointed as a Consultant Laparoscopic Surgeon at Poole NHS Foundation Trust and was asked to introduce the latest laparoscopic techniques for bowel cancer surgery.  He was also tasked with establishing an ‘Enhanced Recovery Programme’, the success of which was recognised when the programme he set up was short-listed for the National Patient Safety Awards in 2011.  Since his appointment, Qureshi has been the Lead Laparoscopic Surgeon and also Enhanced Recovery Lead. Soon after his arrival, Qureshi was invited to form part of the nationally accredited Dorset Endometriosis Centre and is the Lead General Surgeon for this.

Qureshi’s expertise was recognised in 2011 when he was selected by the Department of Health to become a national trainer in Laparoscopic Surgery (LAPCO).  This role required him to teach and assess other Consultant Surgeons around the UK, to ensure they were safe to perform laparoscopic surgery.

In more recent years, Qureshi was asked to form part of a faculty which trains consultant surgeons in other countries.  The aim is to disseminate safe laparoscopic techniques so these surgeons can set up training programmes in their own countries.  He also offers an international Laparoscopic Fellowship in Poole.

Qureshi has strong links with the local University in Bournemouth; he is clinical supervisor at the National Centre for Computer Animation at the university. The aim of this project is to develop a laparoscopic simulator which would help train surgeons in advanced laparoscopic techniques.

During his time at Poole Hospital, Qureshi has attracted significant funds enabling the hospital to purchase £4 million worth of equipment.  This included a ‘state of the art’ Integrated Laparoscopic Theatre in 2009.  More recently, the generosity of one of his patients, Robert Braithwaite (CEO Sunseeker), has enabled Qureshi to purchase a surgical robot which will increase the precision offered during cancer surgery.

Personal
Qureshi is married, with a family.

References

External links

http://news.bbc.co.uk/1/hi/puffbox/hyperpuff/audiovideo/england/hampshire_dorset/8281624.stm
http://www.bournemouthecho.co.uk/news/4658488.Poole_Hospital_s_quiet_revolution_in_cancer_surgery/
https://www.justgiving.com/Robert-Eaton/
http://www.blackmorevale.co.uk/Man-thanks-Poole-Hospital-saving-wife-s-life/story-21338329-detail/story.html
http://www.rotary-ribi.org/clubs/page.php?PgID=222553&ClubID=670
http://www.dorsetsociety.co.uk/society_diary_photos/march_2011/poole_rotary_club_dinner/view/gallery_208091.Poole_Rotary_Club_Dinner/
http://bournemouthdailyecho.newsprints.co.uk/view/17775407/12634049_jpg
https://www.youtube.com/watch?v=omJRiU64s7k
https://www.youtube.com/watch?v=oHkWvOCUvJw

Alumni of King's College London
British gastroenterologists
Living people
Year of birth missing (living people)